Shayon is a given name and a surname. Notable people with this name include the following:

Given name
Shayon Green (born 1991), American gridiron football player 
Shayon Harrison (born 1997), English footballer
Shayon chakraborty (born 2004)

Surname
Robert Lewis Shayon (1912–2008), American writer and producer

See also

Sharon
Shavon (disambiguation)
Shayan